Buchwald is a German and Jewish surname. Notable people with the surname include:

Art Buchwald (1925–2007), American humorist
Charles Buchwald (1880–1951), Danish amateur footballer
Dave Buchwald (born 1970), Computer hacker, filmmaker, artist
David Buchwald (born 1970), American politician
Ephraim Buchwald, American Orthodox rabbi
Gerhard Buchwald (1920–2009), German medical doctor and vaccination critic
Guido Buchwald (born 1961), German footballer and manager
Harold Buchwald (1928–2008), Canadian lawyer
Jed Buchwald, American historian
Manuel Buchwald (born 1940), Peruvian-Canadian geneticist and academic
Naomi Reice Buchwald (born 1944), American jurist, federal judge
Nathaniel Buchwald (1890–1956), American cultural critic and translator
Nathaniel A. Buchwald (1924–2006), American neuroscientist, educator and administrator
Péter Bakonyi (Buchwald) (born 1938), Hungarian Olympic fencer
Stephen Buchwald (born 1955), American chemist

See also
Groß Buchwald, a municipality in the district of Rendsburg-Eckernförde, in Schleswig-Holstein
3209 Buchwald, main-belt asteroid
Buchenwald (disambiguation)

German-language surnames